Pterarene is a genus of small sea snails, marine gastropod mollusks in the family Liotiidae.

Species
Species within the genus Pterarene include:
 Pterarene sakashitai Sakurai & Habe, 1977

References

External links
 To World Register of Marine Species

 
Liotiidae
Monotypic gastropod genera